Santa Marta de Pateros is a title given to a 19th-century apparition of the biblical Saint Martha of Bethany in the town of Pateros, (formerly known as Aguho and a visita of Pasig) in Metro Manila, the Philippines.

Legend
Tradition recounts that in the 1800s, Saint Martha (who legendarily subdued the Tarasque), was invoked by the people of Pateros to vanquish a giant crocodile in the Pateros River that ate their ducks. These animals were main source of their livelihood of highly prized delicacy of balút 
(fertilised duck egg). In Tagalog, the Spanish loanword for duck is pato; and those who raise ducks are called pateros. At that time, domestic ducks (whose eggs produced balut) were abundant in the local river.

One evening, under a full moon, an unnamed bayani (hero) went to the river to slay the creature. At the banks, he saw a brilliant light surrounding the figure of Saint Martha; the creature was never seen again and the local duck industry flourished. The people of Pateros attributed this miracle to Saint Martha and a grand fluvial procession has been held in remembrance of the miracle.

Feast

Formerly, the local feast in honor of Santa Marta de Pateros was variously celebrated in either January, February, or March. Her devotees, as a collegial body, determined the exact date of the feast within these months based on the abundance of balút eggs and the rice harvest, and whether the date coincided with the full moon needed to illuminate the nighttime Pagoda sa Ilog (fluvial procession) as there was no electricity.

In the 1960s, the date was fixed to second Sunday of February to standardise the fiesta following economic and environmental changes to the town. It is also said that during this period, the then-parish priest Monsignor Sicat moved the celebration to July 29, Saint Martha’s liturgical feast in the rest of the Catholic Church.

Pamisa de Gracia
The Pamisa de Gracia (Tagalog-Spanish for “Mass of Grace”) is a ritual and Mass that begins every town fiesta. The Pamisa is done to give thanks for a miracle, birthday, or anniversary obtained or sustained through Saint Martha’s intercession. The family who will organize one borrows the icons of Saints Martha, Roch, and Isidore the Laborer from the houses of their respective camareros and camareras (literally “chamberlains”, the term for the official caretaker of a Santo).

A sunduan (“fetching”) procession for the images begins on a Friday at the house of the caretaker of Saint Isidore’s icon. A brass band accompanies the image and procession, which proceeds to collect the image of Saint Roch from its caretaker’s house, then fetching Saint Martha’s icon. On the next day, Saturday, the host family conducts a prayer vigil at their house, where the icons are enshrined. On Sunday, the host family removes the three icons from their house, and in a second procession brings them to the Church of Saint Roch, for the actual thanksgiving Mass. A third procession after the Mass returns the images to the house of the host family, who then return each icon to the house of its respective caretaker.

The Pamisa is also held anytime a family want to borrow the icons.

Shrine
In 2008, Rev. Fr. Orly Cantillon, the parish priest of the Church of San Roque in Pateros, filed a petition to Francisco C. San Diego D.D., the Bishop of Pasig, requesting that the Parish be made a Diocesan Shrine. The request was granted and the decree presented December 2008. The proclamation was made official February 7, 2009, followed by the annual fiesta the next day.

A popular misconception is that Saint Martha is the patron saint of Pateros. when it is actually Saint Roch. This belief arose from the fact that the town holds a grander celebration on Saint Martha’s feast, while the feast of Saint Roch on 16 August is often scaled down as occurs during the monsoon season. In the 1960s the town priests tried to correct this by moving the celebration from 16 August to the nearest Sunday of the same month. Until today, the feast of Saint Roch is simpler, devoid of merrymaking and feasting.

Sources

 Diocesan Shrine of St. Martha, Parish of St. Roch Website (Filipino)
 Diocesan Shrine of St. Martha, Parish of St. Roch Facebook page (Filipino)
 Poderes de Santa Marta de Pateros Facebook page (Filipino)
 Nocheseda, Elmer I. (March 2002). "Ecological and Ritual Change in the Devotion to Santa Marta of Pateros". Philippine Quarterly of Culture and Society. No. 1/2. University of San Carlos Publications. Volume 30: pages 65–110.

Roman Catholic Church in Metro Manila